Mauricio de Narváez (born 18 May 1941) is a Colombian former racing driver. He competed in the 24 Hours of Le Mans between 1981 and 1985 for Joest Racing, resulting 4th overall in 1983 driving a Porsche 956. He won the 1984 12 Hours of Sebring as an owner-driver in a Porsche 935, joined by Hans Heyer and Stefan Johansson.

De Narváez has been the president of the Colombian Touring & Automobile Club since 2013. He is also an executive in FIA and NACAM.

References

External links
 Mauricio de Narváez at Driver Database
 Mauricio de Narváez at Race Database

1941 births
Living people
Colombian racing drivers
IMSA GT Championship drivers
24 Hours of Le Mans drivers
World Sportscar Championship drivers
12 Hours of Sebring drivers

Team Joest drivers
20th-century Colombian people